The 1925–26 İstanbul Football League season was the 19th season of the league. Galatasaray SK won the league for the 8th time. The tournament was single-elimination, not league as in the past.

Season

Finals
Quarter Finals
Galatasaray - Beykozspor SK 6:2
Fenerbahçe - Harbiye SK 3:2

Semi finals
Fenerbahçe - Fatih İdman Yurdu SK 9:0
Galatasaray SK - Vefa SK 2:1

Final
Fenerbahçe - Galatasaray SK 0:3
Galatasaray SK - Fenerbahçe 3:1

References
 Tuncay, Bülent (2002). Galatasaray Tarihi. Yapı Kredi Yayınları 
 Dağlaroğlu, Rüştü. Fenerbahçe Spor Kulübü Tarihi 1907-1957

Istanbul Football League seasons
Turkey
Istanbul